Jerald Napoles (born March 2, 1983) is a Filipino theater actor and comedian known for his role as Tolits in the musical stage play Rak of Aegis. He is a talent of Triple A Management and has worked in the GMA Network as a host in the weekly variety show Sunday PinaSaya and an actor in That's My Amboy portraying the role of Tope. As of 2019, he transferred to VIVA Entertainment and returns ABS-CBN.

Background
Jerald Napoles finished high school at Florentino Torres High School in Gagalangin, Tondo, Manila. He had been juggling acting and his studies at Pamantasan ng Lungsod ng Maynila taking Chemical Engineering, but he eventually had quit college to focus on his passion for performing.

Career

Early years: Theater career
Napoles who loves dancing fell into acting accidentally when his English teacher in high school, Ethel Rocha, ask him if he wants to join the production of a stage play musical. Jesus Christ Superstar was his first taste of theater when he accepted the offer. With the guidance of theater actor Arnold Reyes, Napoles auditioned for Dulaang UP's musical remake of St. Louis Loves Dem Filipinos and Tanghalang Pilipino's Noli Me Tangere musical. He also did a song from Zsa Zsa Zaturnnah Ze Muzikal. Since then, he had worked with almost all professional theater companies in the Philippines. His most popular role on stage was Tolits, the love interest of lead cast "Aileen" (played by Aicelle Santos and Kim Molina), where he alternated with Kapamilya stars Pepe Herrera and Benj Manalo in the hit Pinoy musical Rak Of Aegis.

2010–present: Television career
His role as Jograd in the re-staging of the musical Magsimula Ka gave him the nod into starting his showbiz career in 2010. He became part of Triple A Talent Management when Jojo Oconer, the COO of Triple A, offered him to join their talent pool. He was part of the 2011 reimagining of the classic sitcom Iskul Bukol of TV5 where he played a student-janitor named Itor.

In 2012, following his break in Magsimula Ka, Napoles was cast in the musical Care Divas as Kayla, one of the five transgender Overseas Filipino Workers in Israel — the only straight guy to play one of the transgender divas in the musical's original run. The same year, he was part of the TV5's remake of the epic series Valiente

Napoles got his big theater break in 2014 when he landed the role of Tolits in the comedy-musical Rak of Aegis where he received rave reviews from critics about his performance. He also played a meatier role on television when he transferred to GMA Network with his first project as Macario Sakay in the historical drama series Katipunan.

The following year, Napoles was included as co-host in the weekly variety show of GMA Network entitled Sunday PinaSaya along with Primetime Queen Marian Rivera, Comedy Queen Ai-Ai delas Alas and the comic duo Jose Manalo and Wally Bayola. He was also in the cast of My Faithful Husband playing the role of Mars, the gay confidante of the lead character, Emman, played by Dennis Trillo.

For a short period of time, Napoles was among the three "celebrity bluffers" in the season finale of the late-night comedy game show Celebrity Bluff. He became part of the romantic-comedy series That's My Amboy as Tope. He left GMA and returned ABS-CBN at the end of 2019; his first stint in ABS-CBN was in FPJ's Ang Probinsyano, where he currently portrays Jimbo Padua, a guest character.

Filmography

Theatre

Film

Television

Television series

Television variety shows

Drama anthologies

References

External links

1983 births
Living people
Filipino male comedians
Filipino male musical theatre actors
Male actors from Manila
People from Tondo, Manila
ABS-CBN personalities
TV5 (Philippine TV network) personalities
GMA Network personalities